Diamondhead is a fictional character appearing in American comic books published by Marvel Comics.

Publication history
Diamondhead first appeared in Nova #3 (Nov. 1976), and was created by Marv Wolfman and Sal Buscema.

The character subsequently appears in Nova #6-8 (Feb.-April 1977), #10 (June 1977), #22-25 (Nov. 1978-May 1979), Fantastic Four #206 (May 1979), #208-209 (July-Aug. 1979), ROM #24 (Nov. 1981), Quasar #16 (Nov. 1990), #20 (March 1991), The New Warriors Annual #1 (1991), Nova vol. 2 #1 (Jan. 1994), #10 (Oct. 1994), Nova: The Human Rocket #2 (June 1999), Civil War: Front Line #9 (Feb. 2007), and Nova vol. 4 #2 (July 2007).

Diamondhead received an entry in the All-New Official Handbook of the Marvel Universe A-Z #3 (2006), and The Official Handbook of the Marvel Universe A to Z HC vol. 02 (2008).

Fictional character biography
Archibald Dyker was a troubled child from South Hampton. A former amateur body champion turned to a life of greed as a petty thug. He was later mutated by a diamond-powered laser while attempting to steal some precious gems. He developed a hard, diamond-like body that was superstrong. He used his new abilities to enhance his criminal career.

After being defeated by Nova, he forms the criminal gang the Terrible Trio with the Condor and Powerhouse. After the Condor is defeated by the Sphinx, Diamondhead allies with the Sphinx and Doctor Sun. Along with his allies, Nova, and the Champions of Xandar, Diamondhead goes to Xandar on Nova's spacecraft.

Once there, Diamondhead betrays the Nova Corps to the Skrulls. This causes the death of one of the Champions, and Diamondhead is left to float in space.

Later, Diamondhead was seen as a prisoner on the Stranger's laboratory world. He escapes and returns to Earth.

Following the Stamford incident, the identities of the New Warriors were publicly leaked, including Nova's. Diamondhead uses this information to locate Nova's parents' house and patiently waits until his nemesis comes home. When Nova returns to Earth after the Annihilation War, Diamondhead attacks him. Nova easily defeats Diamondhead and takes him back to prison.

As part of the Marvel NOW! event, Diamondhead ambushes the new Nova, but is easily defeated and left stranded in the desert.

Powers and abilities
Diamondhead's body is basically one large diamond, making him incredibly strong and incredibly resistant to injury and harm. According to Nova, he can regrow destroyed limbs, given time. His time as a boxer leads him to be a very skilled fighter, who is noted to regularly train for more power. Yet his bad temper, pride and ego diminish his effectiveness in battle when provoked.

References

External links
 Diamondhead at Marvel.com
 Diamondhead at Marvel Wiki

Characters created by Marv Wolfman
Characters created by Sal Buscema
Comics characters introduced in 1976
Fictional characters with superhuman durability or invulnerability
Marvel Comics characters with accelerated healing
Marvel Comics characters with superhuman strength
Marvel Comics mutates
Marvel Comics supervillains